Metro Manila, the capital region of the Philippines, is a large metropolitan area that has several levels of subdivisions. Administratively, the region is divided into seventeen primary local government units with their own separate elected mayors and councils who are coordinated by the Metropolitan Manila Development Authority, a national government agency headed by a chairperson directly appointed by the Philippine president. The cities and municipality that form the region's local government units are further divided into several barangays or villages (formerly called barrios) which are headed by an elected barangay captain and barangay council.

The region as a whole is geographically divided into four districts, of which the first district is the central capital City of Manila, the second and third districts located to the east and north of the City, respectively, and the fourth district covering the remaining areas of the region south of the City and the Pasig River.

Districts
Unlike other administrative regions in the Philippines, Metro Manila is not composed of provinces. Instead, the region is divided into four geographic areas called "districts." The districts have their district centers at the four original cities in the region: the city-district of Manila (Capital District), Quezon City (Eastern Manila), Caloocan (Northern Manila, also informally known as Camanava), and Pasay (Southern Manila). The districts serve mainly to organize the region's local government units for fiscal and statistical purposes.

Cities and municipality

Administrative divisions 

The political and administrative boundaries of the National Capital Region has not changed since its formation in 1975 as a public corporation under Presidential Decree No. 824. They are composed of sixteen independent cities, classified as highly urbanized cities, and one independent municipality: Pateros.

Barangays

The cities and municipality of Metro Manila are divided into barangays with populations ranging from under 1,000 to over 200,000. In the City of Manila, Caloocan and Pasay, the barangays are grouped into zones for strategical purposes. As of 2015, there are 1,710 barangays in Metro Manila.

Other divisions

Congressional districts
In terms of congressional representation, the region has 32 congressional districts with each city comprising one or more districts. The lone municipality of Pateros shares a congressional district with the first district of Taguig.

Council districts 
In terms of Sangguniang Panlungsod (city council, or in the case of Pateros, Sangguniang Bayan or municipal council) representation, each city is divided into city or municipal council districts. These are coextensive to congressional districts above, except that those cities that elect their representative at-large (Las Piñas, Malabon, Mandaluyong, Muntinlupa, Navotas, Pasay, Pasig and San Juan) their city council representation is divided into two districts.

For Taguig, its two congressional districts, with the first district taken without Pateros, are used to determine representation to its city council. For Pateros, it is divided into two districts, independent of Taguig.

Each district sends in an equal number of councilors.

Old districts
Metro Manila cities may also be divided into traditional districts, such as the former municipalities (now city districts) that make up the City of Manila and the historical municipalities and estates like Novaliches, Balintawak, San Francisco del Monte and Diliman that were amalgamated to form Quezon City. Neither division has its own government. In Pasay, traditional districts include Malibay, Santa Clara, San Rafael and Maricaban.

Gated communities
Some cities in Metro Manila may also be divided into several gated communities, also known as subdivisions, which may or may not constitute their own barangays or low-level local government units. Some examples are: Dasmariñas Village in Makati; Ayala Alabang in Muntinlupa; Marina Bay, Merville, Tahanan Village and Better Living Subdivision in Parañaque; Greenhills in San Juan; La Vista, White Plains, BF Homes, Greenmeadows and Filinvest Homes in Quezon City.

Historical divisions

Before 1901

Before 1901, the Province of Manila which today encompasses most of Metro Manila and the northern part of the neighboring province of Rizal was divided into 24 municipalities with Intramuros (then known as Manila) as its capital.

1901–1942
Except for the City of Manila which amalgamated six smaller municipalities in June 1901, the Province of Manila was absorbed by the newly created Province of Rizal with Pasig as its provincial capital.

1942–1947

The City of Greater Manila was formed in January 1942 combining the City of Manila and Quezon City, as well as six other municipalities from Rizal: Caloocan, Makati, Mandaluyong, Parañaque, Pasay and San Juan.

1947–1975
The seven municipalities of the City of Greater Manila were restored and reorganized under the Province of Rizal.

In November 1975 through Presidential Decree No. 824, Metropolitan Manila was created out of four cities and thirteen municipalities (twelve from the province of Rizal and the municipality of Valenzuela from Bulacan) which covers the present-day territory of Metro Manila. It was declared the National Capital Region of the Philippines in June 1978.

References

Geography of Metro Manila
 
Subdivisions of the Philippines
History of Metro Manila
Politics of Metro Manila